The Abeokuta flyover is a flyover in the city of Abeokuta, the capital of Ogun State, southwestern Nigeria. The flyover was constructed at  Ibara roundabout, Abeokuta by the Ogun State Government led by Senator Ibikunle Amosun. It is the first flyover constructed in the state. 
It was commissioned on Thursday January 24, 2013. The investment worth of the flyover is tagged at N1.5bn.

Photo Gallery of Abeokuta flyover

References

Buildings and structures in Abeokuta
Ogun State